The Lola T93/20, and its evolutions and derivatives, the T94/20, T95/20, and the T96/20, are a series of open-wheel formula racing car chassis, designed, developed and built by British racing  manufacturer and constructor Lola, for the one-make Indy Lights spec-series, a feeder-series for the CART IndyCar Series, between 1993 and 1996.

References 

Open wheel racing cars
Lola racing cars